Apne Begaane is a 1989 Bollywood film directed by Madhu Tejpal and starring Sumeet Saigal, Anuradha Patel, A K Hangal, Shashi Puri and Anant Mahadevan.

Cast
Sumeet Saigal
Anuradha Patel
Shashi Puri
Anant Mahadevan
Nandita Thakur
Bharti Achrekar
Bharat Bhushan
A.K. Hangal
Shreeram Lagoo

Music
The film's music has been composed by Prem Gupta and penned by Rajesh Johri.

"Anjaanon Ki Basti Mein" - Manna Dey
"Jaadugar Aaye Hain" - Manna Dey,  Mahendra Kapoor
"Jab Baategi Yeh Jagir" - Preeti Sagar, Jaspal Singh, Vinod Sehgal, Meenakshi
"Saari Duniya Ka Jo Maseeha Hai" - Jagjit Singh
"Dushman Ho Gayi Meri Jawani" - Asha Bhosle, Suresh Wadkar
"Jabse Piya Laage Tose More Nainwa" - Asha Bhosle

References

External links

1980s Hindi-language films
1989 films
Films scored by Prem Gupta